Michelle (Bowyer) Young (born June 25, 1976 in Calgary, Alberta) is a former field hockey forward from Canada, who earned a total number of 75 international caps for the Canadian Women's National Team during her career. She was a student of the University of Alberta, Mount Royal College and Athabasca University where she obtained a Bachelor of Physical Education and a Bachelor of Nursing.

International Senior Tournaments
 1995 – Pan American Games, Mar del Plata, Argentina (3rd)
 1998 – Commonwealth Games, Kuala Lumpur, Malaysia (not ranked)
 1999 – Pan American Games, Winnipeg, Canada (3rd)
 2001 – Pan American Cup, Kingston, Jamaica (3rd)
 2001 – World Cup Qualifier, Amiens/Abbeville, France (10th)

External links
 Profile on Field Hockey Canada
 SanookBook

1976 births
Living people
Canadian female field hockey players
Canadian people of British descent
Sportspeople from Calgary
Field hockey players at the 1998 Commonwealth Games
Commonwealth Games competitors for Canada